Antoni Dyboski, born as Antoni Dybka (5 June 1853 – 23 February 1917) was a Polish lawyer and activist.

Early life and lawyer's career
He was born in Racławice near Nisko as a son of peasant. He finished the gimnazjum in Rzeszów and graduated in law at the University of Lwów. In 1881, Dybka settled in Cieszyn. He was working in the notary office of Andrzej Cinciała, a prominent Polish activist in Cieszyn Silesia. In 1890, Dybka legally changed his name to Dyboski.

After the death of Andrzej Kotula (d. 1891), another notary in Cieszyn, Dyboski became a notary substitute. In 1892, he became a notary. He ran his office in Cieszyn on the Stary Targ no. 141 (from 1892 to 1906) and on the Garncarska 3 (from 1906 to his death).

Activism
In 1884, Dyboski was among a few Catholics, who organized the Polityczne Towarzystwo Ludowe (People's Political Society), a Polish society in Cieszyn Silesia, which was dominated by Lutherans. From 1883 to 1887, he was a member of the board of the Czytelnia Ludowa (People's Library) in Cieszyn.

Later life
Antoni Dyboski died on February 23, 1917, in Cieszyn.

Family 
In 1883, he married Maria Łopuszańska (1858-1925). Maria was the granddaughter of Alfons de Pont-Wullyamoz. Maria's sister was the grandomother of Jerzy Ficowski.

Maria and Antoni had four children: sons Roman (1883-1945), Stanisław (1885-1929) and Tadeusz (1891-1939), and a daughter Jadwiga (baptized as Eleonora Jadwiga, b. 1886).

Footnotes

References

People from Cieszyn
1853 births
1917 deaths
Polish lawyers